Ecotourism is a form of tourism involving responsible travel (using sustainable transport) to natural areas, conserving the environment, and improving the well-being of the local people. Its purpose may be to educate the traveler, to provide funds for ecological conservation, to directly benefit the economic development and political empowerment of local communities, or to foster respect for different cultures and for human rights. Since the 1980s, ecotourism has been considered a critical endeavor by environmentalists, so that future generations may experience destinations relatively untouched by human intervention. Ecotourism may focus on educating travelers on local environments and natural surroundings with an eye to ecological conservation. Some include in the definition of ecotourism the effort to produce economic opportunities that make conservation of natural resources financially possible.

Generally, ecotourism deals with interaction with biotic components of the natural environments. Ecotourism focuses on socially responsible travel, personal growth, and environmental sustainability. Ecotourism typically involves travel to destinations where flora, fauna, and cultural heritage are the primary attractions. Ecotourism is intended to offer tourists an insight into the impact of human beings on the environment and to foster a greater appreciation of our natural habitats. Ecotourism aims at minimal environmental impact on the areas visited. Besides fostering respect towards the natural environment, ecotourism also helps in creating socio-economic benefits for the communities of the area visited.

Responsible ecotourism programs include those that minimize the negative aspects of conventional tourism on the environment and enhance the cultural integrity of local people. Therefore, in addition to evaluating environmental and cultural factors, an integral part of ecotourism is the promotion of recycling, energy efficiency, water conservation, and creation of economic opportunities for local communities. For these reasons, ecotourism often appeals to advocates of environmental and social responsibility.

Many consider the term "ecotourism", like "sustainable tourism" (which is a related concept but broader), an oxymoron. Like most long-distance travel, ecotourism often depends on air transportation, which contributes to climate change. Additionally, "the overall effect of sustainable tourism is negative where like ecotourism philanthropic aspirations mask hard-nosed immediate self-interest."

Benefits 

Ecotourism is a sub-component of the field of sustainable tourism. Ecotourism must serve to maximize ecological benefits, while contributing to the economic, social and cultural wellbeing of communities living close to ecotourism venues.

Potential ecological, economic and sociocultural benefits associated with ecotourism are described below.

Potential Ecological Benefits 
A primary challenge is to make sure that ecotourism does not compromise the ecological integrity of protected areas and welfare of local communities. Although ecotourism is not supposed to have negative ecological outcomes, these may occur regardless. Ecotourism is widely assumed to have many positive ecological consequences, and some of them are listed as follows:

Direct Benefits 

 Incentive to protect natural environments
 Incentive to rehabilitate modified environments and lands
 Provides funds to manage and expand protected areas
 Ecotourists assist with habitat maintenance and enhancement through their own actions 
 Ecotourists serving as watchdogs or guardians who personally intervene in situations where the environment is perceived to be threatened

Indirect benefits 

 Exposure to ecotourism fosters a broader sense of environmentalism
 Communities experience changes in environmental attitude and behavior
 Areas protected for ecotourism provide environmental benefits

Potential Economic Benefits 
For many decision-makers, economic factors are more compelling than ecological factors in deciding how natural resources should be utilized. Ecotourism economic benefits are presented below:

Direct Benefits 

 Generates revenue (related to visitor expenditures) and creates employment that is directly related to the sector 
 Provides economic opportunities for peripheral regions

Indirect Benefits 

 High multiplier effect and indirect revenue employment
 Supports cultural and heritage tourism, sectors that are highly compatible with ecotourism.

Potential Socio-Cultural Benefits 
A holistic approach on ecotourism must promote socio-cultural as well as economic and ecological practices. The direct and indirect socio-cultural benefits are outlined as follows:

Direct and Indirect Benefits 

 Foster community stability and wellbeing through economic benefits and local participation
 Aesthetic and spiritual benefits and enjoyment for locals and tourists
 Accessible to a broad spectrum of the population

When assessing potential positive impacts of ecotourism, it is necessary to mention that ecotourism can have unintended negative effects as well. Negative impacts can be mitigated through regulations and codes of conduct that effectively and persuasively impart messages about appropriate visitor behavior.

Terminology and history 

Ecotourism is a late 20th-century neologism compounded eco- and tourism. According to the Oxford English Dictionary, ecotour was first recorded in 1973 and ecotourism, "probably after ecotour", in 1982.
ecotour, n. ... A tour of or visit to an area of ecological interest, usually with an educational element; (in later use also) a similar tour or visit designed to have as little detrimental effect on the ecology as possible or undertaken with the specific aim of helping conservation efforts.
ecotourism, n. ... Tourism to areas of ecological interest (typically exotic and often threatened natural environments), esp. to support conservation efforts and observe wildlife; spec. access to an endangered environment controlled so as to have the least possible adverse effect.

Some sources suggest the terms were used nearly a decade earlier. Claus-Dieter (Nick) Hetzer, an academic and adventurer from Forum International in Berkeley, CA, coined ecotourism in 1965, according to the Contra Costa Times, and ran the first ecotours in the Yucatán during the early 1970s.

The definition of ecotourism adopted by Ecotourism Australia is: "Ecotourism is ecologically sustainable tourism with a primary focus on experiencing natural areas that fosters environmental and cultural understanding, appreciation and conservation."

The Global Ecotourism Network (GEN) defines ecotourism as "responsible travel to natural areas that conserves the environment, sustains the well-being of the local people, and creates knowledge and understanding through interpretation and education of all involved (visitors, staff and the visited)".

Ecotourism is often misinterpreted as any form of tourism that involves nature (see jungle tourism). Self-proclaimed practitioners and hosts of ecotourism experiences assume it is achieved by simply creating destinations in natural areas. According to critics of this commonplace and assumptive practice, true ecotourism must, above all, sensitize people to the beauty and the fragility of nature. These critics condemn some operators as greenwashing their operations: using the labels of "green" and "eco-friendly”, while behaving in environmentally irresponsible ways.

Although academics disagree about who can be classified as an ecotourist and there is little statistical data, some estimate that more than five million ecotourists—the majority of the ecotourist population—come from the United States, with many others from Western Europe, Canada and Australia.

Currently, there are various moves to create national and international ecotourism certification programs. National ecotourism certification programs have been put in place in countries such as Costa Rica, Australia, Kenya, Estonia, and Sweden.

Related terms

Sustainable tourism

Improving sustainability

Principles 
Ecotourism in both terrestrial and marine ecosystems can benefit conservation, provided the complexities of history, culture, and ecology in the affected regions are successfully navigated. Catherine Macdonald and colleagues identify the factors which determine conservation outcome, namely whether: animals and their habits are sufficiently protected; conflict between people and wildlife is avoided or at least suitably mitigated; there is good outreach and education of the local population into the benefits of ecotourism; there is effective collaboration with stakeholders in the area; and there is proper use of the money generated by ecotourism to conserve the local ecology. They conclude that ecotourism works best to conserve predators when the tourism industry is supported both politically and by the public, and when it is monitored and controlled at local, national, and international levels.

Regulation and accreditation 
Because the regulations of ecotourism may be poorly implemented, ecologically destructive greenwashed operations like underwater hotels, helicopter tours, and wildlife theme parks can be categorized as ecotourism along with canoeing, camping, photography, and wildlife observation. The failure to acknowledge responsible, low-impact ecotourism puts legitimate ecotourism companies at a competitive disadvantage.

Management strategies to mitigate destructive operations include but are not limited to establishing a carrying capacity, site hardening, sustainable design, visitation quotas, fees, access restrictions, and visitor education.

Many environmentalists have argued for a global standard that can be used for certification, differentiating ecotourism companies based on their level of environmental commitment, creating a standard to follow. A national or international regulatory board would enforce accreditation procedures, with representation from various groups including governments, hotels, tour operators, travel agents, guides, airlines, local authorities, conservation organizations, and non-governmental organizations. The decisions of the board would be sanctioned by governments, so that non-compliant companies would be legally required to disassociate themselves from the use of the ecotourism brand.
	
In 1998, Crinion suggested a Green Stars System, based on criteria including a management plan, benefit for the local community, small group interaction, education value and staff training. Ecotourists who consider their choices would be confident of a genuine ecotourism experience when they see the higher star rating.
	
In 2008 the Global Sustainable Tourism Council Criteria was launched at the IUCN World Conservation Congress. The Criteria, managed by the Global Sustainable Tourism Council, created a global standard for sustainable travel and tourism and includes criteria and performance indicators for destinations, tour operators and hotels. The GSTC provides accreditation through a third-party to Certification Bodies to legitimize claims of sustainability. 
	
Environmental impact assessments could also be used as a form of accreditation. Feasibility is evaluated from a scientific basis, and recommendations could be made to optimally plan infrastructure, set tourist capacity, and manage the ecology. This form of accreditation is more sensitive to site-specific conditions.

Some countries have their own certification programs for ecotourism. Costa Rica, for example, runs the GSTC-Recognized Certification of Sustainable Tourism (CST) program, which is intended to balance the effect that business has on the local environment. The CST program focuses on a company's interaction with natural and cultural resources, the improvement of quality of life within local communities, and the economic contribution to other programs of national development. CST uses a rating system that categorizes a company based upon how sustainable its operations are. CST evaluates the interaction between the company and the surrounding habitat; the management policies and operation systems within the company; how the company encourages its clients to become an active contributor towards sustainable policies; and the interaction between the company and local communities/the overall population. Based upon these criteria, the company is evaluated for the strength of its sustainability. The measurement index goes from 0 to 5, with 0 being the worst and 5 being the best.

Labels and certification
Over 50 ecolabels on tourism exist. These include (but are not limited to):
 Austrian Ecolabel for Tourism
 Asian Ecotourism Standard for Accommodations (AESA)
 Eco-certification Malta
 EarthCheck Australia
 Ecotourism Australia
 Ecotourism Ireland
 Ecotourism Kenya
 European Ecotourism Labelling Standard (EETLS)
 Korean Ecotourism Standard

Guidelines and education

An environmental protection strategy must address the issue of ecotourists removed from the cause-and-effect of their actions on the environment. More initiatives should be carried out to improve their awareness, sensitize them to environmental issues, and care about the places they visit.

Tour guides are an obvious and direct medium to communicate awareness. With the confidence of ecotourists and intimate knowledge of the environment, tour guides can actively discuss conservation issues. Informing ecotourists about how their actions on the trip can negatively impact their environment and the local people. A tour guide training program in Costa Rica's Tortuguero National Park has helped mitigate negative environmental impacts by providing information and regulating tourists on the parks' beaches used by nesting endangered sea turtles.

Small scale, slow growth and local control
The underdevelopment theory of tourism describes a new form of imperialism by multinational corporations that control ecotourism resources. These corporations finance and profit from the development of large scale ecotourism that causes excessive environmental degradation, loss of traditional culture and way of life, and exploitation of local labor. In Zimbabwe and Nepal's Annapurna region, where underdevelopment is taking place, more than 90 percent of ecotourism revenues are expatriated to the parent countries, and less than 5 percent go into local communities.
	
The lack of sustainability highlights the need for small scale, slow growth, and locally based ecotourism. Local peoples have a vested interest in the well-being of their community, and are therefore more accountable to environmental protection than multinational corporations, though they receive very little of the profits. The lack of control, westernization, adverse impacts to the environment, loss of culture and traditions outweigh the benefits of establishing large scale ecotourism. Additionally, culture loss can be attributed to cultural commodification, in which local cultures are commodified in order to make a profit. 
	
The increased contributions of communities to locally managed ecotourism create viable economic opportunities, including high-level management positions, and reduce environmental issues associated with poverty and unemployment. Because the ecotourism experience is marketed to a different lifestyle from large scale ecotourism, the development of facilities and infrastructure does not need to conform to corporate Western tourism standards, and can be much simpler and less expensive. There is a greater multiplier effect on the economy, because local products, materials, and labor are used. Profits accrue locally and import leakages are reduced. The Great Barrier Reef Park in Australia reported over half of a billion dollars of indirect income in the area and added thousands of indirect jobs between 2004 and 2005. However, even this form of tourism may require foreign investment for promotion or start-up. When such investments are required, it is crucial for communities to find a company or non-governmental organization that reflects the philosophy of ecotourism; sensitive to their concerns and willing to cooperate at the expense of profit. The basic assumption of the multiplier effect is that the economy starts off with unused resources, for example, that many workers are cyclically unemployed and much of industrial capacity is sitting idle or incompletely utilized. By increasing demand in the economy, it is then possible to boost production. If the economy was already at full employment, with only structural, frictional, or other supply-side types of unemployment, any attempt to boost demand would only lead to inflation. For various laissez-faire schools of economics which embrace Say's Law and deny the possibility of Keynesian inefficiency and under-employment of resources, therefore, the multiplier concept is irrelevant or wrong-headed.
	
As an example, consider the government increasing its expenditure on roads by $1 million, without a corresponding increase in taxation. This sum would go to the road builders, who would hire more workers and distribute the money as wages and profits. The households receiving these incomes will save part of the money and spend the rest on consumer goods. These expenditures, in turn, will generate more jobs, wages, profits, and so on with the income and spending circulating around the economy.

The multiplier effect arises because of the induced increases in consumer spending which occur due to the increased incomes — and because of the feedback into increasing business revenues, jobs, and income again. This process does not lead to an economic explosion not only because of the supply-side barriers at potential output (full employment) but because at each "round", the increase in consumer spending is less than the increase in consumer incomes. That is, the marginal propensity to consume (MPC) is less than one, so that each round some extra income goes into saving, leaking out of the cumulative process. Each increase in spending is thus smaller than that of the previous round, preventing an explosion.

Efforts to preserve ecosystems at risk 
Some of the world's most exceptional biodiversity is located in the Galapagos Islands. These islands were designated a UNESCO World Heritage site in 1979, then added to UNESCO's List of World Heritage in Danger in 2007. IGTOA is a non-profit dedicated to preserving this unique living laboratory against the challenges of invasive species, human impact, and tourism. For travelers who want to be mindful of the environment and the impact of tourism, it is recommended to utilize an operator that is endorsed by a reputable ecotourism organization. In the case of the Galapagos, IGTOA has a list of the world's premiere Galapagos Islands tour companies dedicated to the lasting protection and preservation of the destination.

Natural resource management 
Natural resource management can be utilized as a specialized tool for the development of ecotourism. There are several places throughout the world where a number of natural resources are abundant, but with human encroachment and habitats, these resources are depleting. Without the sustainable use of certain resources, they are destroyed, and floral and fauna species are becoming extinct. Ecotourism programs can be introduced for the conservation of these resources. Several plans and proper management programs can be introduced so that these resources remain untouched, and there are many organizations–including nonprofits–and scientists working on this field.
	
Natural resources of hill areas like Kurseong in West Bengal are plenty in number with various flora and fauna, but tourism for business purpose poised the situation. Researchers from Jadavpur University are presently working in this area for the development of ecotourism to be used as a tool for natural resource management.

In Southeast Asia government and nongovernmental organizations are working together with academics and industry operators to spread the economic benefits of tourism into the kampungs and villages of the region. A recently formed alliance, the South-East Asian Tourism Organisation (SEATO), is bringing together these diverse players to discuss resource management concerns.

A 2002, summit held in Quebec led to the 2008 Global Sustainable Tourism Criteria–a collaborative effort between the UN Foundation and other advocacy groups. The criteria, which are voluntary, involve the following standards: "effective sustainability planning, maximum social and economic benefits for local communities, minimum negative impacts on cultural heritage, and minimum negative impacts on the environment."There is no enforcing agency or system of punishments.for summit.

Impact on Indigenous people and Indigenous land 
Valorization of the Indigenous territories can be important for designation as a protected area, which can deter threats such as deforestation. Ecotourism can help bring in revenue for indigenous peoples.

However, there needs to be a proper business plan and organizational structure, which helps to ensure that the generated money from ecotourism indeed flows towards the Indigenous peoples themselves, and the protection of the Indigenous territory. Debates around ecotourism focus on how profits off of Indigenous lands are enjoyed by international tourist companies, who do not share back with the people to whom those lands belong. Ecotourism offers a tourist-appealing experience of the landscape and environment, one that is different from the experience of the residents; it commodifies the lives of Indigenous people and their land which is not fair to its inhabitants.

Indigenous territories are managed by governmental services (i.e. FUNAI in Brazil, ...) and these governmental services can thus decide whether or not to implement ecotourism in these Indigenous territories.

Ecotourism can also bring in employment to the local people (which may be Indigenous people). Protected areas for instance require park rangers, and staff to maintain and operate the ecolodges and accommodation used by tourists. Also the traditional culture can act as a tourist attraction, and can create a source of revenue by asking payment for the showing of performances (i.e. traditional dance, ...) Ecotourism can also help mitigate deforestation that happens when local residents, under economic stress, clear lands and create smallholder plots to grow cash crops. Such land clearing hurts the environment. Ecotourism can be a sustainable and job-creating alternative for local populations.

Depending on how protected areas are set up and handled, it can lead to local people losing their homes, and mostly with no compensation. Pushing people onto marginal lands with harsh climates, poor soils, lack of water, and infested with livestock and disease does little to enhance livelihoods even when a proportion of ecotourism profits are directed back into the community. Harsh survival realities and deprivement of traditional use of land and natural resources by local people can occur. Local Indigenous people may also get a strong resentment towards the change, especially if tourism has been allowed to develop with virtually no controls. This, as it can lead to too many lodges being built, and tourist vehicles may drive off-track and harass the wildlife, if no control mechanisms have been put in place and tourist vehicles can indeed be used. Vehicle use may erode and degrade land".

There is a longstanding failure by the Peruvian government to acknowledge and protect Indigenous lands, and therefore the Indigenous peoples have been forced to protect their own land. The land has a better chance of staying safe and free from deforestation if the people who care about it are the ones looking over it.

Criticism

Definition
In the continuum of tourism activities that stretch from conventional tourism to ecotourism, there has been a lot of contention to the limit at which biodiversity preservation, local social-economic benefits, and environmental impact can be considered "ecotourism". For this reason, environmentalists, special interest groups, and governments define ecotourism differently. Environmental organizations have generally insisted that ecotourism is nature-based, sustainably managed, conservation supporting, and environmentally educated. The tourist industry and governments, however, focus more on the product aspect, treating ecotourism as equivalent to any sort of tourism based in nature. As a further complication, many terms are used under the rubric of ecotourism. Nature tourism, low impact tourism, green tourism, bio-tourism, ecologically responsible tourism, and others have been used in literature and marketing, although they are not necessarily synonymous with ecotourism.
	
The problems associated with defining ecotourism have often led to confusion among tourists and academics. Many problems are also subject of considerable public controversy and concern because of green washing, a trend towards the commercialization of tourism schemes disguised as sustainable, nature based, and environmentally friendly ecotourism. According to McLaren, these schemes are environmentally destructive, economically exploitative, and culturally insensitive at its worst. They are also morally disconcerting because they mislead tourists and manipulate their concerns for the environment. The development and success of such large scale, energy intensive, and ecologically unsustainable schemes are a testament to the tremendous profits associated with being labeled as ecotourism.

Negative impact 
Ecotourism has become one of the fastest-growing sectors of the tourism industry. One definition of ecotourism is "the practice of low-impact, educational, ecologically and culturally sensitive travel that benefits local communities and host countries". Many of the ecotourism projects are not meeting these standards. Even if some of the guidelines are being executed, the local communities are still facing many of the negative impacts.The other negative side of ecotourism is that it transforms nature and the environment into commodities people are interested in paying and visiting. When the environment becomes a product with economic value, people try to advertise and sell it. Some of the ecotourism sites are turning to private sectors, and the government cut off their funding. Hence, they are obligated to make money on their own. Private natural parks and sites are looking for their own advantage by advertising the soundness of natural parks or coastal marines in the Caribbean. They try to show they are protecting nature and attract people interested In ecotourism. However, they will focus on the phenomenon that might be more interesting for tourists and neglect other aspects of nature when they prioritize their profits. Consequently, this policy will result in abandoning rich ecological sites or destroying those valuable sites. For example, in Montego Bay, hotel staff cut the seagrass that appeared to drive back tourists; conversely, they are crucial for local nutrient cycles.

The other problem is that the companies try to hide the truth behind the ecotourism to maintain their profit. They don't cover the fact that traveling from other countries to the natural sites burns extensive amounts of aircraft fuel. In Montego Bay and Negril, a considerable amount of run-off is released to the coastal water produced directly or indirectly by ecotourists. Hotels in Jamaica release much more wastewater than a city. The tourists generate a lot of waste that ends up in the coastal water. The indirect effect of ecotourism in Jamaica is that many people migrated to the town near the natural site because of the more job opportunities due to construction increase, resulting in destroying the environment. South Africa is one of the countries that is reaping significant economic benefits from ecotourism, but the negative effects far outweigh the positive—including forcing people to leave their homes, gross violations of fundamental rights, and environmental hazards—far outweigh the medium-term economic benefits. A tremendous amount of money and human resources continue to be used for ecotourism despite unsuccessful outcomes, and even more, money is put into public relation campaigns to dilute the effects of criticism. Ecotourism channels resources away from other projects that could contribute more sustainable and realistic solutions to pressing social and environmental problems. "The money tourism can generate often ties parks and managements to ecotourism". But there is a tension in this relationship because ecotourism often causes conflict and changes in land-use rights, fails to deliver promises of community-level benefits, damages environments, and has many other social impacts. Indeed, many argue repeatedly that ecotourism is neither ecologically nor socially beneficial, yet it persists as a strategy for conservation and development due to the large profits. While several studies are being done on ways to improve the ecotourism structure, some argue that these examples provide a rationale for stopping it altogether. However, there are some positive examples, among them the Kavango-Zambezi Transfrontier Conservation Area (KAZA) and the Virunga National Park, as judged by WWF.
	
The ecotourism system exercises tremendous financial and political influence. The evidence above shows that a strong case exists for restraining such activities in certain locations. Funding could be used for field studies aimed at finding alternative solutions to tourism and the diverse problems Africa faces in result of urbanization, industrialization, and the overexploitation of agriculture. At the local level, ecotourism has become a source of conflict over control of land, resources, and tourism profits. In this case, ecotourism has harmed the environment and local people and has led to conflicts over profit distribution. In a perfect world, more efforts would be made towards educating tourists of the environmental and social effects of their travels. Very few regulations or laws stand in place as boundaries for the investors in ecotourism. These should be implemented to prohibit the promotion of unsustainable ecotourism projects and materials which project false images of destinations, demeaning local and indigenous culture.

Though conservation efforts in East Africa are indisputably serving the interests of tourism in the region it is important to make the distinction between conservation acts and the tourism industry. Eastern African communities are not the only of developing regions to experience economic and social harms from conservation efforts. Conservation in the Southwest Yunnan Region of China has similarly brought drastic changes to traditional land use in the region. Prior to logging restrictions imposed by the Chinese Government the industry made up 80 percent of the regions revenue. Following a complete ban on commercial logging the indigenous people of the Yunnan region now see little opportunity for economic development. Ecotourism may provide solutions to the economic hardships suffered from the loss of industry to conservation in the Yunnan in the same way that it may serve to remedy the difficulties faced by the Maasai. As stated, the ecotourism structure must be improved to direct more money into host communities by reducing leakages for the industry to be successful in alleviating poverty in developing regions, but it provides a promising opportunity.

Drumm and Moore (2002) discuss the price increase and economic leakage in their paper; saying that prices might augment since the visitors are more capable to pay higher rates for goods and services in opposition to the locals. Also, they have mentioned two solutions regarding the previous issue: (1) either a two pricing system represented as two separate price lists (the first for the locals and the second for the tourists with respect to the local's purchase power ability); (2) design unique goods and services subject only or the tourists’ consumption. Leakage appears when international investors import foreign products instead of using local resources; thus, the tourists will be using international products and in-turn contributing to the outside economy rather than the local one (Drumm & Moore, 2002).

Direct environmental impacts 
Ecotourism operations occasionally fail to live up to conservation ideals. It is sometimes overlooked that ecotourism is a highly consumer-centered activity, and that environmental conservation is a means to further economic growth.

Although ecotourism is intended for small groups, even a modest increase in population, however temporary, puts extra pressure on the local environment and necessitates the development of additional infrastructure and amenities. The construction of water treatment plants, sanitation facilities, and lodges come with the exploitation of non-renewable energy sources and the utilization of already limited local resources. The conversion of natural land to such tourist infrastructure is implicated in deforestation and habitat deterioration of butterflies in Mexico and squirrel monkeys in Costa Rica. In other cases, the environment suffers because local communities are unable to meet the infrastructure demands of ecotourism. The lack of adequate sanitation facilities in many East African parks results in the disposal of campsite sewage in rivers, contaminating the wildlife, livestock, and people who draw drinking water from it.
	
Aside from environmental degradation with tourist infrastructure, population pressures from ecotourism also leaves behind garbage and pollution associated with the Western lifestyle. An example of this is seen with ecotourism in Antarctica. Since it is such a remote location, it takes a lot of fuel to get there; resulting in ships producing large pollution through waste disposal and green house gas emissions. Additionally, there is a potential for oil spills from damaged ships traversing through aggressive waters filled with natural obstacles such as icebergs. Although ecotourists claim to be educationally sophisticated and environmentally concerned, they rarely understand the ecological consequences of their visits and how their day-to-day activities append physical impacts on the environment. As one scientist observes, they "rarely acknowledge how the meals they eat, the toilets they flush, the water they drink, and so on, are all part of broader regional economic and ecological systems they are helping to reconfigure with their very activities." Nor do ecotourists recognize the great consumption of non-renewable energy required to arrive at their destination, which is typically more remote than conventional tourism destinations. For instance, an exotic journey to a place 10,000 kilometers away consumes about 700 liters of fuel per person.
	
Ecotourism activities are, in and of themselves, issues in environmental impact because they may disturb fauna and flora. Ecotourists believe that because they are only taking pictures and leaving footprints, they keep ecotourism sites pristine, but even harmless-sounding activities such as nature hikes can be ecologically destructive. In the Annapurna Circuit in Nepal, ecotourists have worn down the marked trails and created alternate routes, contributing to soil impaction, erosion, and plant damage. Where the ecotourism activity involves wildlife viewing, it can scare away animals, disrupt their feeding and nesting sites, or acclimate them to the presence of people. In Kenya, wildlife-observer disruption drives cheetahs off their reserves, increasing the risk of inbreeding and further endangering the species. In a study done from 1995 to 1997 off the Northwestern coast of Australia, scientists found that whale sharks' tolerance for divers and swimmers decreased. The whale sharks showed an increase in behaviors over the course of the study, such as diving, porpoising, banking, and eye rolling that are associated with distress and attempt to avoid the diver. The average time the whale sharks spent with the divers in 1995 was 19.3 minutes, but in 1997 the average time the whale sharks spent with the divers was 9.5 minutes. There was also an increase in recorded behaviors from 56% of the sharks showing any sort of diving, porpoising, eye rolling or banking in 1995 to 70.7% in 1997. Some whale sharks were also observed to have scars that were consistent with being struck by a boat.

Environmental hazards 
The industrialization, urbanization and agricultural practices of human society are having a serious impact on the environment. Ecotourism is now also considered to be playing a role in environmental depletion including deforestation, disruption of ecological life systems and various forms of pollution, all of which contribute to environmental degradation. For example, the number of motor vehicles crossing a park increases as tour drivers search for rare species. The number of roads disrupts the grass cover, which has serious consequences on plant and animal species. These areas also have a higher rate of disturbances and invasive species due to increasing traffic off of the beaten path into new, undiscovered areas. Ecotourism also has an effect on species through the value placed on them. "Certain species have gone from being little known or valued by local people to being highly valued commodities. The commodification of plants may erase their social value and lead to overproduction within protected areas. Local people and their images can also be turned into commodities". Kamuaro points out the relatively obvious contradiction that any commercial venture into unspoiled, pristine land inevitably means a higher pressure on the environment. The people who live in the areas now becoming ecotourism spots have very different lifestyles than those who come to visit. Ecotourism has created many debates based on if the economic benefits are worth the possible environmental sacrifices.

Who benefits? 
Most forms of ecotourism are owned by foreign investors and corporations that provide few benefits to the local people. An overwhelming majority of profits are put into the pockets of investors instead of reinvestment into the local economy or environmental protection leading to further environmental degradation. The limited numbers of local people who are employed in the economy enter at its lowest level and are unable to live in tourist areas because of meager wages and a two-market system.

In some cases, the resentment by local people results in environmental degradation. As a highly publicized case, the Maasai nomads in Kenya killed wildlife in national parks but are now helping the national park to save the wildlife to show aversion to unfair compensation terms and displacement from traditional lands. The lack of economic opportunities for local people also constrains them to degrade the environment as a means of sustenance. The presence of affluent ecotourists encourage the development of destructive markets in wildlife souvenirs, such as the sale of coral trinkets on tropical islands and animal products in Asia, contributing to illegal harvesting and poaching from the environment. In Suriname, sea turtle reserves use a very large portion of their budget to guard against these destructive activities.

Eviction of indigenous people 

Fortress conservation is a conservation model based on the belief that biodiversity protection is best achieved by creating protected areas where ecosystems can function in isolation from human disturbance. It is argued that money generated from ecotourism is the motivating factor to drive indigenous inhabitants off the land. Up to 250,000 people worldwide have been forcibly evicted from their homes to make way for conservation projects since 1990, according to the UN special rapporteur on the rights of indigenous peoples.

Mismanagement by government 
While governments are typically entrusted with the administration and enforcement of environmental protection, they often lack the commitment or capability to manage ecotourism sites. The regulations for environmental protection may be vaguely defined, costly to implement, hard to enforce, and uncertain in effectiveness. Government regulatory agencies, are susceptible to making decisions that spend on politically beneficial but environmentally unproductive projects. Because of prestige and conspicuousness, the construction of an attractive visitor's center at an ecotourism site may take precedence over more pressing environmental concerns like acquiring habitat, protecting endemic species, and removing invasive ones. Finally, influential groups can pressure, and sway the interests of the government to their favor. The government and its regulators can become vested in the benefits of the ecotourism industry which they are supposed to regulate, causing restrictive environmental regulations and enforcement to become more lenient.
	
Management of ecotourism sites by private ecotourism companies offers an alternative to the cost of regulation and deficiency of government agencies. It is believed that these companies have a self-interest in limited environmental degradation because tourists will pay more for pristine environments, which translates to higher profit. However, theory indicates that this practice is not economically feasible and will fail to manage the environment.

The model of monopolistic competition states that distinctiveness will entail profits, but profits will promote imitation. A company that protects its ecotourism sites is able to charge a premium for the novel experience and pristine environment. But when other companies view the success of this approach, they also enter the market with similar practices, increasing competition and reducing demand. Eventually, the demand will be reduced until the economic profit is zero. A cost-benefit analysis shows that the company bears the cost of environmental protection without receiving the gains. Without economic incentive, the whole premise of self-interest through environmental protection is quashed; instead, ecotourism companies will minimize environment related expenses and maximize tourism demand.

The tragedy of the commons offers another model for economic unsustainability from environmental protection, in ecotourism sites utilized by many companies. Although there is a communal incentive to protect the environment, maximizing the benefits in the long run, a company will conclude that it is in their best interest to utilize the ecotourism site beyond its sustainable level. By increasing the number of ecotourists, for instance, a company gains all the economic benefit while paying only a part of the environmental cost. In the same way, a company recognizes that there is no incentive to actively protect the environment; they bear all the costs, while the benefits are shared by all other companies. The result, again, is mismanagement.

Taken together, the mobility of foreign investment and lack of economic incentive for environmental protection means that ecotourism companies are disposed to establishing themselves in new sites once their existing one is sufficiently degraded.

In addition, the systematic literature review conducted by Cabral and Dhar (2019) have identified several challenges due to slow progression of ecotourism initiatives such as (a) economic leakages, (b) lack of government involvement, (c) skill deficiency among the local communities, (d) absence of disseminating environmental education, (e) sporadic increase in pollution, (f) conflict between tourism management personnel and local communities and (g) inadequate infrastructure development.

Case studies 
The purpose of ecotourism is to engage tourists in low impact, non-consumptive and locally oriented environments in order to maintain species and habitats — especially in underdeveloped regions. While some ecotourism projects, including some found in the United States, can support such claims, many projects have failed to address some of the fundamental issues that nations face in the first place. Consequently, ecotourism may not generate the very benefits it is intended to provide to these regions and their people, and in some cases leaving economies in a state worse than before.
	
The following case studies illustrate the rising complexity of ecotourism and its impacts, both positive and negative, on the environment and economies of various regions in the world.

 Ecotourism in Costa Rica
 Ecotourism in Jordan
 Ecotourism in South Africa
 Ecotourism in the United States

See also 

 
 
 
 
 
 
 
 
 
 
 

 
 
 
 
 
 
 
 
 
 
 
 
 
 
 
 
 Overtourism

References

Further reading 
 
 Ceballos-Lascurain, H. 1996. Tourism, Ecotourism, and Protected Areas.
 Larkin, T. and K. N. Kähler. 2011. "Ecotourism." Encyclopedia of Environmental Issues. Rev. ed. Pasadena: Salem Press. Vol. 2, pp. 421–424. 
 IUCN. The International Union for the Conservation of Nature. 301 pp.
 Ceballos-Lascurain, H. 1998. Ecoturismo. Naturaleza y Desarrollo Sostenible.
 
 
 
 
 Reguero Oxide, M. del. 1995. Ecoturismo. Nuevas Formas de Turismo en el Espacio rural. Ed. Bosch Turismo

External links 

 

 
Adventure travel
Ecological economics
Natural resource management
Types of tourism